The Road Called Straight is a 1919 American silent comedy-drama film directed by Lloyd Ingraham and starring Louis Bennison, Ormi Hawley, Henry Mortimer, Berton Churchill, Jane Adler, and John Daly Murphy. The film was released by Goldwyn Pictures on April 20, 1919.

Plot

Cast
Louis Bennison as Al Boyd
Ormi Hawley as Betty Swiftmore
Henry Mortimer as Harrison Stevens
Berton Churchill as Robert Swiftmore
Jane Adler as Betty's Mother
John Daly Murphy as Steven's Valet

Preservation
The film is now considered lost.

References

External links

1919 comedy-drama films
1910s English-language films
1919 films
American silent feature films
American black-and-white films
Goldwyn Pictures films
Lost American films
1910s American films
Lost comedy-drama films
Silent American comedy-drama films
1919 lost films